James Loster (January 1, 1894- April 20, 1948) was the stage name for acrobat James "Jimmy" T. Fitzpatrick. He and his wife performed as James and Bernie Loster. Bernie's real name was Florence Cush Fitzpatrick. He was active on the vaudeville circuit (B. F. Keith, Keith-Albee) from 1914-1928.

He was president of the Pittsburgh Branch of the American Guild of Variety Artists (AGVA) and the United Entertainers, Local 921.

References

Acrobats
1948 deaths
1894 births
People from Sioux City, Iowa
American stunt performers
Vaudeville performers